Li Qing (born 1981) is a Chinese artist based in Hangzhou, Zhejiang Province, China.

Life 
Li was born in the Zhejiang province.
Li attended the China Academy of Art, graduating from the Oil Painting department in 2004.

Style 
Li Qing's main medium is oil painting on canvas. He has also worked with photography.

He is a painter whose work confronts issues surrounding visual perception – his Point Out The Differences series consists of pairs of paintings based on the same image, into which Li inserts a number of differences not immediately obvious to the viewer.  Li is part of a generation of Chinese artists increasingly informed by the images and history of Western culture. Li Qing has brought his experience from the exploration of painting language to new mediums (2010 video Drift Poetry of feathers floating through the air inside a down-coat factory).

Works 
In 2002, as a student in the China Academy of Art, Li was looking for a way to make painting into a more spiritual experience and not only an aesthetic experience. He created the work named "2002 – Keen Experience 1." He described this work in his thesis paper:
"Post Enlightenment science and reason did not resolve the chronic illness of the human spirit as people had hoped; that illness was rooted in the limitations of the human body and life, and resulted in emptiness and absurdity in existential values. Only transcendental methods such as religion and philosophy could lead man to spiritual limitlessness, and solve the problems of death and the body and soul. Art is also one of those methods. Intellectual art uses the fabrication and illumination of multiple times and spaces to dispel the pressure that is brought on man by limitlessness and death, and to complete the expansion of the individual life. As painting is an art form directed at the eternal, it must bear the weight of this problem....I yearn to engage in a form of painting practice that can carry ideas and the spirit, and avoids the dead end of painting serving only as the subject of aesthetic appraisal and consumption."

Li describes himself as having as "computer programmer" approach, based on his series "Finding Differences." This series, which he began in 2005, is inspired by a type of video game where the player finds differences between images. He uses this series to break the normal aesthetic that painting can bring.

In 2006, Li began a series of oil paintings called "Images of Mutual Undoing and Unity," in which Li takes two images and paints them together, so they become one painting. He described this series:
"The works in this series (Images of Mutual Undoing and Unity ) show the audience a process of two forms destroying and melding with each other, where disintegration and reshaping happen together. The changes and disintegration of the markings of the two forms imply that reality is an illusion, like so many people and events appearing in succession through history. Perhaps both the stage and the backstage are false. The famous actors depicted here are everyone’s unverifiable self; we have no way of knowing at what time our selves originated from supposition. Perhaps we completely began with supposition.11 The toughest part is that the two paintings are lost forever. Nothing can be restored. It is like so much spilled milk in life, but it is still worth mourning. The resulting forms are but aren’t; they’re muddled, like so many of our worn memories – a form slowly emerging from the depths of memory. The world of the past is always relegated to decline and amorphousness; some things have left us, some things linger. Is that which lingers longer real? The strange thing is, everything is as expected and nothing is as expected."

Selected exhibitions

Solo exhibition

2011 
 A Note—Fontana in His Later Years, Platform China Space, Beijing, China
 Relative Altitude, Arario Gallery, New York, USA

2010 
 Drift, Centro de Artes Tomás y Valiente, Madrid, Spain
 Shattered vision (an addition to Drift), Gao Magee Gallery, Madrid, Spain

2009 
 Ghosting, Duolun Museum Of Modern Art, Shanghai, China
 Curtain, Hanart TZ Gallery, Hong Kong, China

2008 
 Collision in the Air, DF2 Gallery, Los Angeles, USA
 Ghosting, Iberia Center for Contemporary Art, Beijing, China

2006 
 Finding Together, F2 Gallery, Beijing, China

Group exhibition

2012 
 Boy: A Contemporary Portrait, Leo Xu Projects, Shanghai, China

2011 
 Surplus Goodlookingness, Tang Contemporary Art Beijing, Beijing, China
 One Man Theatre, He Xiangning Art Museum, Nanshan District Shenzhen, China
 Ramble, F2 Gallery, Beijing, China
 Community of Tastes:Chinese Contemporary Art from 2000, São Paulo Museum of Contemporary Art, São Paulo, Brasil
 ARCO, Madrid, Spain
 Expression of Chinese Contemporary Art, Today Art Museum, Beijing, China
 19 Solo Shows About Painting, Platform China Contemporary Art Institute, Beijing, China
 Pure Views: New Painting From China, Asian Art Museum of San Francisco, San Francisco, USA
 Painting Lesson I : Illusion or Delusion, Yang Gallery, Beijing, China
 A Wedding, Para/Site Art Space, Hong Kong, China
 Urban Utopia, Deutsche Bank Collection, Hong Kong, China
 Almost Tangible, Arariobeijing Gallery 1, Beijing, China
 Fly Through The Tropo‐Sphere: Memo of The New Generation Painting, Iberia Center for Contemporary Art, Beijing, China
 Chengdu Biennale, Chengdu, China

2010 
 Asian Landmark‐Toyota Art Project, Iberia Center for Contemporary Art, Beijing, China
 Jungle: A Close‐up Focus on Chinese Contemporary Art Trends, Platform China Contemporary Art Institute, Beijing, China
 TORA TORA TORA: Chinese Cutting‐Edge Photography Exhibition, Beijing, China
 Here, There ‐ The World in Motion, Li Space, Beijing, China/ Lu Xun Academy of Art, Shenyang, China
 Reshaping History: Chinart from 2000 to 2009, China National Convention Center, Beijing, China
 ARTHK2010, Hong Kong Convention and Exhibition Centre, Hong Kong, China
 Community of Tastes: Chinese Contemporary Art from 2000, Chile Museum of Contemporary Art, Santiago, Chile
 Do You See What I Mean?, Fabien Fryns Fine Art, Los Angeles, USA
 The Personal Dimension: Four Emerging Artists from China, Arario Gallery, New York, USA
 10 Cases studies of Post‐70s Art, Hong Kong Exhibition Centre, Hong Kong, China
 Pure Views: New Painting From China, Louise Blouin Foundation, London, UK

2009 
 In the Mood for Paper, F2 Gallery, Beijing, China
 Out Law, Li Space, Beijing, China
 What Has Been Happening Here? – The Inaugural Exhibition of Chinese Independent Film Archive, Iberia Center for Contemporary Art, Beijing, China
 Reflect Light – Depth of New Art, West Lake Art Museum, Hangzhou, China/Wall Art Museum, Beijing, China
 Blade – Reconstruct Leifeng Pagoda, S Z Art Centre, Beijing, China
 Art Beijing 2009 – Artist Cinema, Agricultural Exhibition Center, Beijing, China
 ARTHK08, Hong Kong Convention and Exhibition Centre, Hong Kong, China
 Prague Biennale 4, Prague, Czech
 Textbook: An Exhibition Of Lively Chinese Paintings, Li Space, Beijing, China

2008 
 Time-Lag: The New Force of Chinese Contemporary Art, Magee Art Gallery, Madrid, Spain
 Unpack – Chinese Experiment Art, China Academy of Art, Hangzhou, China
 ARTHK08, Hong Kong Convention and Exhibition Centre, Hong Kong, China
 Poetic Realism: An Reinterpretation of Jiangnan – Contemporary Art from South China, Tomás y Valiente Art Centre, Madrid, Spain
 55 Days in Valencia-Chinese Art Meeting, Institut Valencia d’Art Morden, Valencia, Spain
 China Gold – Chinese Contemporary Art, Museum Maillol, Paris, France
 Case studies of Artists in Art History and Art Criticism, S Z Art Centre, Beijing, China
 Notes of Conception – A Local Narrative of Chinese Contemporary Painting, Iberia Center for Contemporary Art, Beijing, China
 Virtual City – New Power – China Contemporary Art Biennale 2008, Yuangong Art Museum, Shanghai, China
 Asia – the 3d Nanjing triennial, Nanjing Museum, Nanjing, China
 Deep Pond and Float Chamber, Qinghe Museum of Contemporary Art, Nanjing, China
 The Revolution Continues – New Chinese Art, Saatchi Gallery, London, UK
 Chinese Fantasies, Found Museum, Beijing, China
 Game Is Not Over, Arario Gallery, Beijing, China
 Art Asia Miami, Miami, USA

2007 
 Time Difference – New Art from China and USA, Initial Access, Wolverhampton, UK
 The Great Yangtze River Bridge, White Canvas Gallery, Nanjing, China
 The First Today’s Documents, Today Art Museum, Beijing, China
 Beyond Image – Chinese New Painting, Shanghai Art Museum, Shanghai, China

2006 
 See the luck when raise head, Contemporary Art, Hangzhou
 See the luck when open the door, Wuxi Contemporary Art Exhibition tour, China
 10+10, Shanghai Zendai Museum of Modern Art, Shanghai
 Beyond Dimension – Chinese New Painting, Square Gallery of Contemporary Art, Nanjing, China
 Potential Dialogue – The Party of Sino-Austria young artists, RCM Museum, Nanjing, China
 Exhibition of Zhejiang young painters & awarded Academy Prize, Zhejiang exhibition center, Hangzhou, China

2005 
 Young Chinese Contemporary Art, Hangar-7, Salzburg, Austria
 Archaeology of the Future, 2nd Triennial of Chinese art, Nanjing Museum, Nanjing
 The Spring of Vizcaya: Exhibition of Paintings and Sculptures of Chinese and French Artists, Shanghai
 2005 Zhejiang Oil-painting exhibition & awarded the Gold Prize, Ningbo Art Museum, Ningbo, China

 2004 
 Layer After Layer: Contemporary Painting in Shanghai'', Zhejiang Exhibition Centre

Works collected by 
 China Academy of Art, Hangzhou, China
 Institut Valencià d’Art Morden (IVAM), Valencia, Spain
 International Art & Culture Foundation (IAC) of Spain
 FC MOCA/ Frank Cohen Collection Manchester, UK
 Saatchi Gallery, London, UK
 Hangar-7, Salzburg, Austria
 DSL Foundation, Paris, France
 Kent Logan Foundation, San Francisco, USA
 Shanghai Zendai Museum of Modern Art, Shanghai, China
 Square Museum of Contemporary Art, Nanjing, China
 RCM Museum, Nanjing, China
 Yuangong Art Museum, Shanghai, China

Artists exhibited with 
Jérôme Bel, the Luo Brothers (罗氏兄弟), HE Chi, Liu Chuang,
Yu Fan, Chen Fei, Yang Fudong, ZHOU Haiying, Guo Hongwei, Zhang Hui, Yu Ji,
Ma Jun, Liu Liguo, MA, Chi Peng, SHI Qing, Ma Qiu-sha, Cheng Ran, Wu Rigen,
Yang Shuangqing, Liang Shuo, Xu Tan, Wolfgang Tillmans, Fred Tomaselli, Danh Vo,
Apichatpong Weerasethakul, Chen Wei, Hu Xiangqian, Mei Yuangui, Ren Zh

References

External links 
 Li Qing at Fabien Fryns Fine Art
 Li Qing featured in an article at ArtZineChina.com
 Further information and images from the Saatchi Gallery
 Li Qing Drift (a la deriva) some images Iberia art
 "The making of Drift" at Centro de Artes Tomás y Valiente, Madrid, Spain Behind the scenes by artlinkart
 A la deriva, video interview with Li Qing source: sermadridsur in spanish
 Some works of 'A note' Platform China

1981 births
Living people
Artists from Hangzhou
China Academy of Art alumni
Painters from Zhejiang